This article shows the 14-player roster of all participating teams at the 2022 ASEAN Grand Prix – First Leg.

Indonesia
Head coach:  Risco Matulesy

1 Nandita Salsabila 
2 Ratri Wulandari 
3 Megawati Pertiwi 
6 Yolana Pangestika 
7 Amalia Nabila (c) 
8 Tisya Putri 
9 Arsela Purnama 
10 Putri Andya Agustina 
11 Shintia Mauludina 
14 Dita Azizah 
15 Yuliana Yolla 
17 Wilda Sugandi 
20 Shella Onnan

Philippines
Head coach:  Sherwin Meneses

 
3 Celine Domingo 
5 Risa Sato 
6 Jeanette Panaga 
7 Michele Theresa Gumabao 
8 Jorella Marie de Jesus 
10 Maria Paulina Soriano 
11 Kyla Llana Atienza 
12 Julia Melissa Morado-De Guzman (c) 
13 Fille Saint Merced Cainglet-Cayetano 
15 Kyle Negrito 
16 Rizza Jane Mandapat 
17 Rosemarie Vargas 
18 Diana Mae Carlos 
23 Jessica Margarett Galanza

Thailand
Head coach:  Danai Sriwatcharamethakul

 
1 Wipawee Srithong 
2 Piyanut Pannoy 
3 Pornpun Guedpard (c) 
6 Kannika Thipachot 
8 Watchareeya Nuanjam 
12 Hattaya Bamrungsuk 
13 Natthanicha Jaisaen 
15 Kaewkalaya Kamulthala  
16 Pimpichaya Kokram 
18 Ajcharaporn Kongyot 
21 Thanacha Sooksod 
22 Nattaporn Sanitklang 
24 Tichakorn Boonlert 
25 Sasipaporn Janthawisut

Vietnam
Head coach:  Nguyễn Tuan Kiêt

 
1 Lê Thị Thanh Liên 
3 Trần Thị Thanh Thúy (c) 
6 Nguyễn Thị Uyên 
7 Phạm Thị Nguyệt Anh 
9 Trần Thị Bích Thủy 
11 Hoàng Thị Kiều Trinh 
14 Võ Thị Kim Thoa 
15 Nguyễn Thị Trinh 
16 Vi Thi Như Quỳnh 
17 Đoàn Thị Xuân 
18 Lưu Thị Huệ 
19 Đoàn Thị Lâm Oanh 
22 Nguyễn Thị Kim Liên 
23 Lý Thị Luyến

References

Women's volleyball squads
ASEAN
2022 in volleyball